Hayek  is a surname:

 As a variant spelling of the Czech name Hájek, which originally meant "a grove", it commonly occurs in Czech place names. It occurs among Polish Jews in a Polish language spelling as Chajek.
 The family name Hayek, Hayeck, Haiek or Haick is a Lebanese Christian last name, and can be found in other parts of the Levant.

Notable people with the surname include:

European surname 

 Gustav von Hayek (1836–1911), Czech-born Austrian naturalist, father of botanist August von Hayek
 August von Hayek (1871–1928), Austrian botanist, father of economist Friedrich Hayek
 Friedrich A. Hayek (1899–1992), Austrian-British, Nobel Memorial Prize winning economist and political philosopher
 Frank Forest (born Frank Hayek, 1896–1976), American singer and actor
 Julie Hayek (born 1960), American beauty queen and actress
 Peter Hayek (born 1957), retired American ice hockey player
 Thaddaeus Hagecius ab Hayek (1525–1600), Czech physician and astronomer

Levantine surname 

 Antoine Hayek (1928–2010), Roman Catholic Archbishop of Baniyas of the Melkite Greek Catholic Church 1989–2006
 Dina Hayek (born Collet Bou Gergis, 1982), popular Lebanese singer
 Gebran Hayek (1927–1992), Lebanese journalist and editor in chief of Lisan-al-Hal the oldest Lebanese daily newspaper 
 Ignace Antoine II Hayek (Antun Hayek, 1910–2007), Patriarch of Antioch of the Syriac Catholic Church 1968–1998
 Nicolas Hayek (1928–2010), Lebanese–Swiss co-founder of the Swatch Group
 Renée Hayek, Lebanese writer and novelist 
 Rita Hayek (born 1987), Lebanese actress
 Salma Hayek (born 1966), Mexican actress of Lebanese descent 
 Sami Hayek (born 1972), Mexican furniture designer of Lebanese descent, brother of Salma
 Samuel Hayek (born 1953), Israeli real-estate businessman of Iraqi-Jewish descent
 Hossam Haick (born 1975), Israeli-Arab scientist and engineer.

See also 
 Hájek (disambiguation), the original Czech form of the name
 Haik (disambiguation)

Arabic-language surnames
Surnames of Czech origin